Bumba can refer to:

Geography
 Bumba, Democratic Republic of the Congo, a town on the Congo River
 Bumba, a crater on Rhea

People
 Bumba Da, nickname of Bengali film actor Prasenjit Chatterjee
 Claudiu Bumba, a Romanian football player

Other
 Bumba (god), or Mbombo, the supreme deity of the Bushongo people
 , a children's television series created by Studio 100
 Bumba (spider), a genus of spiders in the subfamily Theraphosinae
 Bumba Meu Boi, a Brazilian folk theatrical tradition
 "Bumba", a song from Soulfly on their self-titled debut album